Aperto ’93 is the title of an exhibition of contemporary art conceived by Helena Kontova and Giancarlo Politi, and organized by Helena Kontova for the XLV edition of the Venice Biennale, directed by Achille Bonito Oliva in 1993. It reprised and expanded the concept of the exhibition Aperto, a new section in the Biennale for young artists ideated by Bonito Oliva and Harald Szeemann in 1980.

Concept and realisation

The show, entitled “Emergency/Emergenze,” signified a shift in the history of exhibition making. Instead of proposing a vision developed by a sole curator – or curatorial team – Aperto ’93 proposed a rhizomic or cellular model. In this model different points of view related to the then emerging scene, deeply influenced by the process of globalization, underlined the necessity of coexistence and cohabitation and furthermore a fragmentation of the way to think and criticize visual art.

Kontova the editor, together with Politi, of Flash Art Italia and Flash Art International (www.flashartonline.com), took over the legacy of “Aperto” the section of the Venice Biennale devoted to emerging artists created in 1980 and inaugurated with a show curated by Achille Bonito Oliva and Harald Szeemann and then abolished in 1997 by Jean Clair.

The curators altered the emphasis from a mere section into a "show within a show," featuring works by 120 artists including: Laura Aguilar, Matthew Barney, Henry Bond, Christine Borland, Maurizio Cattelan, Collection Yoon Ja & Paul Devautour, John Currin, Sylvie Fleury, Dominique Gonzalez-Foerster, Felix Gonzalez-Torres, Lothar Hempel, Damien Hirst, Carsten Höller, Sean La nders, Paul McCarthy, Gabriel Orozco, Philippe Parreno, Simon Patterson, Charles Ray, Pipilotti Rist, Andres Serrano, Kiki Smith, Rudolf Stingel, Rirkrit Tiravanija, Andrea Zittel, Wu Shanzhuan, Wang Youshen, Emmanuel Kane Kuei and Botala Tala.

Anticipating "the curators’ era," Aperto ’93 consisted of 13 sections, each of them managed by then-emerging curators, many of whom are now internationally acclaimed, such as Francesco Bonami (first Italian to curate the Whitney Biennial), Nicolas Bourriaud (theoretician of Relational Art), Kong Changan, Antonio D'Avossa, Jeffrey Deitch (director of the Museum of Contemporary Art, Los Angeles), Thomas Locher, Robert Nickas, Matthew Slotover (founder of Frieze magazine and art fair), Berta Sichel and Benjamin Weil.

Critical reception
The show became a cult event of the ’90s, managing to frame what was happening at that time.

Artforum published a review entitled "Aperto 93: The Better Biennale". The model of Aperto ’93 is often quoted by curators, and it was a source of inspiration for the 2003 Venice Biennale directed by Francesco Bonami, the first Moscow Biennale, the second Johannesburg Biennale directed by Okwui Enwezor, and the first and second Gwangju Biennale.

Artists in Aperto '93 

 Laura Aguilar
 Pep Agut
 Kai Althoff
 Janine Antoni
 Filadelfo Anzalone
 Hany Armanious
 Matthew Barney
 Sadie Benning
 Biefer & Zgraggen
 Bigert & Bergström
 Henry Bond
 Christine Borland
 Marco Brandizzi
 Angela Bulloch
 Kathe Burkhart
 Giorgio Cattani
 Maurizio Cattelan
 Cercle Ramo Nash
 Dawn Clements
 Mat Collishaw
 Meg Cranston
 John Currin
 Mario Dellavedova
 Jessica Diamond
 Cheryl Donegan
 Milena Dopitová
 Lukas Duwenhögger
 Maria Eichhhorn
 Róza El-Hassan
 Marcelo Expósito
 Ocean Earth Construction and Development Corporation
 Sylvie Fleury
 Formento & Sossella
 Dominique González-Foerster
 Félix Gonzáles-Torres
 Gotscho
 Renée Green
 Scott Grodesky
 Sigrid Hackenberg
 Haha
 Lothar Hempel
 José Antonio Hernández-Diez
 Damien Hirst
 Carsten Höller
 Martin Honert
 Richard House
 Fabrice Hybert
 Wendy Jacob
 Michael W. Joo
 Samuel Kane Kwei
 Josif Kiraly
 Dimitris Kozaris
 Elke Krystufek
 Carter Kustera
 Alix Lambert 
 Sean Landers
 Zbigniew Libera
 Eva Marisaldi
 Daniel J. Martinez
 Paul McCarthy
 Lee Ming-Sheng
 Dan Mihaltianu
 Regina Möller
 Mondo / Mokoh
 Gianmarco Montesano
 Liliana Moro / Bernhard Rüdiger
 Kirsten Mosher
 Kohdai Nakahara
 New Madras Agency
 Bonnie Ntshalintshali
 Kristin Oppenheim
 Gabriel Orozco
 Anatoly Osmolovsky
 Laurie Palmer
 Agelo Papadimitriou
 Paper Tiger Television
 Philippe Parreno
 Simon Patterson
 Hirsch Perlman
 Dan Peterman
 Vong Phaophanit
 Steven Pippin
 Premiata Ditta s.a.s. (Vincenzo Chiarandà e Anna Stuart Tovini)
 Luca Quartana
 Charles Ray
 Rosângela Rennó
 Pipilotti Rist
 Julie Roberts
 Alexis Rockman
 Christopher Roth
 Nancy Rubins
 Doris Salcedo
 Sergio Sarra
 Eran Schaerf
 Nicolaus Schafhausen
 Julia Scher
 Rainald Schumacher
 Andres Serrano
 Wu Shanzhuan
 Torsten Slama
 Kiki Smith
 Nedko Solakov
 Ivano Sossella
 Georgina Starr
 Franz Stauffenberg
 Rudolf Stingel
 SubREAL
 Botala Tala
 Rikrit Tiravanija
 Maria Grazia Toderi
 TODT
 Rigoberto Torres
 Oliviero Toscani
 Octavian Trauttmansdorff
 Noboru Tsubaki
 Patrick Van Caeckenbergh
 Niek Van De Steeg
 Eugenia Vargas
 Rolf Walz
 Nari Ward 
 Sue Williams
 Yukinori Yanagi
 Wang Youshen
 Peter Zimmermann
 Andrea Zittel

Bibliography 

 

 

 

 

 

 

 Ricci, Clarissa (2013). "La Biennale di Venezia 1993 – 2003: L’esposizione come piattaforma". Venice: Università Ca' Foscari Venezia.

References
.

External links 

 "45th Esposizione Internazionale d'Arte: punti cardinali dell'arte", asac.labiennale.org.

Art exhibitions in Italy
Venice Biennale exhibitions